Mokai is a rural community in the Taupo District and Waikato region of New Zealand's North Island.

The local Mōkai Marae and Pakake Taiari meeting house is a meeting place for: Pouākani, the Ngāti Tūwharetoa hapū of Ngāti Hā, Ngāti Moekino, Ngāti Parekāwa, Ngāti Tarakaiahi, Ngāti Te Kohera, the Ngāti Wairangi and the Ngāti Raukawa hapū of Ngāti Moekino, Ngāti Parekāwa, Ngāti Tarakaiahi, Ngāti Te Kohera, the Ngāti Wairangi hapū of Ngāti Tūwharetoa, Ngāti Whaita and Ngāti Hā.

Mokai Power Station is a geothermal power station owned by the Tuaropaki Power Company and operated by Mercury Energy. It was constructed in 1999 and expanded in 2005 and 2007.

Demographics
The SA1 area is part of the larger Marotiri statistical area.

The SA1 area had a population of 174 at the 2018 New Zealand census, unchanged since the 2013 census, and a decrease of 6 people (−3.3%) since the 2006 census. There were 60 households, comprising 96 males and 81 females, giving a sex ratio of 1.19 males per female. The median age was 25.1 years (compared with 37.4 years nationally), with 48 people (27.6%) aged under 15 years, 57 (32.8%) aged 15 to 29, 63 (36.2%) aged 30 to 64, and 9 (5.2%) aged 65 or older.

Ethnicities were 69.0% European/Pākehā, 44.8% Māori, 5.2% Pacific peoples, and 8.6% Asian. People may identify with more than one ethnicity.

Although some people chose not to answer the census's question about religious affiliation, 67.2% had no religion, 22.4% were Christian, 3.4% had Māori religious beliefs and 3.4% had other religions.

Of those at least 15 years old, 6 (4.8%) people had a bachelor's or higher degree, and 33 (26.2%) people had no formal qualifications. The median income was $34,900, compared with $31,800 nationally. 18 people (14.3%) earned over $70,000 compared to 17.2% nationally. The employment status of those at least 15 was that 75 (59.5%) people were employed full-time, 30 (23.8%) were part-time, and 6 (4.8%) were unemployed.

Education

See also
Mokai Tramway

References

Taupō District
Populated places in Waikato